Mudvayne is an American heavy metal band formed in Peoria, Illinois in 1996. Known for their sonic experimentation, face and body paint, masks and uniforms, the band has sold over six million records worldwide, including nearly three million in the United States. The group consists of guitarist Greg Tribbett, drummer Matthew McDonough, lead vocalist Chad Gray, and bassist Ryan Martinie. The band became popular in the late-1990s Peoria, Illinois underground music scene, and found success with the single "Dig" from their debut album L.D. 50 (2000). After releasing four more albums and touring relentlessly for nearly a decade, Mudvayne went on hiatus in 2010. They reunited in 2021 and continue to perform live.

History

Early days, Kill, I Oughtta and L.D. 50 (1996–2001)
Mudvayne, formed in 1996 in Peoria, Illinois, originally consisted of lead singer Chad Gray, bassist Shawn Barclay, guitarist Greg Tribbett and drummer Matthew McDonough. The band's lineup finalized when Gray, who was earning $40,000 a year in a factory, quit his day job to become its singer. In 1997, Mudvayne financed its debut EP, Kill, I Oughtta.

During the EP's recording Barclay was replaced by Ryan Martinie, former bassist for the progressive rock band Broken Altar. After self-distributing Kill, I Oughtta, Mudvayne adopted stage names and face paint.

Chuck Toler managed the band as they recorded their 2000 debut album L.D. 50. For the album, Mudvayne experimented with a ragged, dissonant sound; a sound collage, prepared for the album, was used as a series of interludes. L.D. 50 was produced by the band and Garth Richardson, with executive production by Slipknot member Shawn Crahan and Slipknot manager Steve Richards.

L.D. 50 peaked at No. 1 on the Billboard Top Heatseekers chart and No. 85 on the Billboard 200. The singles "Dig" and "Death Blooms" peaked at No. 33 and No. 32 on the Mainstream Rock Tracks chart. Although the album was praised, some critics found the band hard to take seriously.

To promote L.D. 50, Mudvayne played on the Tattoo the Earth tour with Nothingface, Slayer, Slipknot and Sevendust. Nothingface guitarist Tom Maxwell became friends with Mudvayne vocalist Chad Gray, and they explored the possibility of a supergroup. The following year, Nothingface again toured with Mudvayne; although plans for a supergroup continued, they were put on hold due to scheduling conflicts. Gray and Maxwell had discussed five names for the group, and Mudvayne guitarist Greg Tribbett approached Maxwell "out of the blue" to join it. Although Nothingface drummer Tommy Sickles played on the group's demo, the search for another drummer began.

The End of All Things to Come and Lost and Found (2002–2005)
In 2002, Mudvayne released The End of All Things to Come, which the band considers its "black album" due to its largely-black artwork. Isolation inspired the album's songs. During its mixing, Gray and McDonough stopped at Bob's Big Boy and Gray remembered overhearing someone "say something like, ' ... and he's got to cut his own eye out'". When he asked McDonough if he heard the conversation McDonough said he hadn't, and Gray thought it was someone discussing a scene from a screenplay.

The album expanded on L.D. 50, with a wider range of riffs, tempos, moods and vocals. Because of this experimentation, Entertainment Weekly called this album more "user-friendly" than its predecessor and it was one of 2002's most acclaimed heavy-metal albums, it was eventually certified Gold by the RIAA in 2003. The music video for the single "Not Falling" demonstrated Mudvayne's change in appearance from L.D. 50, with the musicians transformed into veined creatures with white, egg-colored bug eyes. In 2003, Mudvayne participated in the Summer Sanitarium Tour, headlined by Metallica, and in September, Chad Gray appeared on V Shape Mind's debut studio album Cul-De-Sac.

In January 2004, the band began work on its third album, produced by Dave Fortman. As for the previous album, Mudvayne withdrew to write songs; they moved into a house, writing the album in four months before recording began after the Summer Sanitarium tour ended. In February, Gray and Martinie expressed an interest in appearing on Within The Mind – In Homage to the Musical Legacy of Chuck Schuldiner, a tribute to the founder of the metal band Death, but the album was never produced.

In 2005, Chad Gray established independent record label Bullygoat Records and Bloodsimple's debut album, A Cruel World (with a guest appearance by Gray), appeared in March. On April 12, Mudvayne released Lost and Found. The album's first single, "Happy?", featured complex guitar work and Gray described "Choices" as "the eight-minute opus".

In August, former Mudvayne bassist Shawn Barclay released his band Sprung's debut album, mastered by King's X guitarist Ty Tabor. That month, rumors spread that Bullygoat Records would release We Pay Our Debt Sometimes: A Tribute to Alice in Chains, with performances by Mudvayne, Cold, Audioslave, Breaking Benjamin, Static-X and the surviving members of Alice in Chains. A spokesperson for Alice in Chains told the press that the band was unaware of any tribute album, and Mudvayne's manager said that reports of the album were only rumors.

In September, the band met with director Darren Lynn Bousman, whose film Saw II was in production and would include "Forget to Remember" from Lost and Found. Bousman showed them a scene of a man cutting his eye out of his skull to retrieve a key. When Gray told Bousman about the conversation at Bob's Big Boy two years earlier, Bousman said he holds his production meetings at the restaurant and Saw II was based on a screenplay he wrote years earlier. Gray appeared briefly in the film, and the music video for "Forget to Remember" contained clips from Saw II.

The New Game and Mudvayne (2006–2009)
In 2006, Gray, Tribbett and Tom Maxwell were joined by former Pantera and Damageplan drummer Vinnie Paul for the supergroup Hellyeah. On March 8, when Mudvayne and Korn performed at the KBPI Birthday Bash in Denver, Thornton waitress Nicole LaScalia was injured during Mudvayne's set. Two years later, LaScalia filed a lawsuit against radio station owner Clear Channel Broadcasting, concert promoter Live Nation, the University of Denver and members of Mudvayne and Korn. During the summer, Gray, Tribbett, Maxwell and Paul recorded an album as Hellyeah. After a tour with Sevendust, Mudvayne released the 2007 retrospective By the People, for the People (compiled from selections chosen by fans on the band's website). The album debuted at number 51 on the U.S. Billboard 200 chart, selling about 22,000 copies in its first week.

After Gray and Tribbett returned from touring with Hellyeah, Mudvayne began recording The New Game with Dave Fortman. After the album's 2008 release, Fortman told MTV that it would be followed in six months by another full-length record.

For its self-titled fifth album, Mudvayne hoped to create a "white album", describing its cover art. The album, printed with blacklight paint, was only visible under a black light (a light whose wavelength is primarily ultraviolet). Mudvayne was recorded in the summer of 2008 and released in 2009.

Hiatus (2010–2021)
In 2010, Mudvayne again paused to allow Gray and Tribbett to tour with Hellyeah, and, because of the supergroup's album releases, the band would be on hiatus until at least 2014. With Hellyeah, Tribbett has recorded three albums: Hellyeah, Stampede and Band of Brothers. Gray has contributed to an additional fourth, fifth and sixth albums, Blood for Blood, Unden!able and Welcome Home. In 2012, Ryan Martinie toured with Korn as a temporary replacement for bassist Reginald Arvizu, who remained at home during his wife's pregnancy. The following year, Martinie played bass on Kurai's debut EP, Breaking the Broken, In 2014, Tribbett left Hellyeah.

Reunion (2021–present)
On April 19, 2021, Mudvayne announced that they had reunited and would play their first shows in 12 years in the fall, which included festival appearances at Inkcarceration Music & Tattoo in Mansfield, Aftershock in Sacramento and Welcome to Rockville in Florida; concert promoter and festival organizer Danny Wimmer stated that these would be the band's only live appearances for 2021. The band were previously scheduled to also appear at Louder Than Life in Louisville, before the performance was canceled on September 21 due to Gray and some staff members contracting COVID-19. The members of Mudvayne have reportedly discussed the possibility of new material. The band's reunion resumed in the summer of 2022 with appearances at Upheaval Festival in Grand Rapids and Rock Fest in Cadott, followed by their first US tour in 13 years, which saw Mudvayne co-headline the Freaks on Parade tour with Rob Zombie. The tour's stop in Tampa made headlines when during one show, Gray fell off the stage while performing the song "Not Falling". Gray himself noted the irony, and joked it was "amazing" and "unbelievable".

Musical style and influences

Mudvayne is noted for its musical complexity, complex meters and polyrhythms. The band's music contains what McDonough calls "number symbolism", where certain riffs correspond to lyrical themes. Mudvayne has incorporated elements of death metal, jazz, jazz fusion, progressive rock, speed metal, thrash metal and world music.

Mudvayne's influences include Tool, Pantera, King Crimson, Genesis, Emerson, Lake & Palmer, Carcass, Deicide, Emperor, Miles Davis, Black Sabbath, and Rush. Mudvayne have repeatedly expressed admiration for Stanley Kubrick's 2001: A Space Odyssey, and were influenced by the film during the recording of L.D. 50.

Although Mudvayne has described its style as "math rock" and "math metal", drummer Matthew McDonough said in 2009: "I honestly don't know what 'math metal' is. I made a joke early on in Mudvayne's career that we used an abacus in writing. It seems I should be careful making jokes in interviews. I don't really see Mudvayne as an innovator in anything." Music critics and journalists have categorized the band as alternative metal, nu metal, experimental metal, extreme metal, hard rock, heavy metal, math metal, groove metal, neo-progressive metal, neo-progressive rock, progressive rock, and progressive metal. Eli Enis of Revolver magazine wrote that the band "wriggled between nu-metal, alt-metal, prog and hard rock in a way that remains completely unrivaled to this day. No one else has or ever will sound quite like them."

Appearance

Although Mudvayne was known for its appearance, Gray described its aesthetic as "music first, visuals second". When L.D. 50 was released, the band performed in horror film-style makeup. Epic Records initially promoted Mudvayne without focusing on its members; early promotional materials featured a logo instead of photos of the band, but its appearance and music videos publicized L.D. 50. The members of Mudvayne were originally known by the stage names Kud, sPaG, Ryknow and Gurrg. At the 2001 MTV Video Music Awards (where they won the MTV2 Award for "Dig"), the band appeared in white suits with bloody bullet-hole makeup on their foreheads. After 2002, Mudvayne changed makeup styles (from multicolored face paint to extraterrestrials) for promotional photos and changed their stage names to Chüd, Güüg, Rü-D, and Spüg, though they would continue to perform in the horror-style makeup live. According to the band, the extravagant makeup added a visual aspect to their music and set them apart from other metal bands. From 2003 up until their dissolution, Mudvayne largely abandoned the use of makeup to avoid image comparisons with the band Slipknot. With their 2021 reunion, they began wearing makeup again when performing live.

Band members

Current members
 Greg Tribbett – guitars, backing vocals , lead vocals 
 Matthew McDonough – drums, keyboards 
 Chad Gray – lead vocals 
 Ryan Martinie – bass 
Touring members
 Marcus Rafferty – guitars, backing vocals 

Former members
 Shawn Barclay – bass 

Timeline

Discography

Studio albums
L.D. 50 (2000)
The End of All Things to Come (2002)
Lost and Found (2005)
The New Game (2008)
Mudvayne (2009)

Awards and nominations
MTV Video Music Awards

|-
| 2001 || "Dig" || MTV2 Award || 

Grammy Awards

|-
| 2006 || "Determined" || Best Metal Performance ||

References

Bibliography

External links

 
 Mudvayne on Facebook
 Mudvayne on MySpace
 Mudvayne on Twitter

 
1996 establishments in Illinois
American alternative metal musical groups
American nu metal musical groups
American progressive metal musical groups
Epic Records artists
Heavy metal musical groups from Illinois
Musical groups established in 1996
Musical groups disestablished in 2010
Musical groups reestablished in 2021
Musical quartets
Culture of Peoria, Illinois
Progressive rock musical groups from Illinois
Hard rock musical groups from Illinois
Rock music groups from Illinois